Xiaonanmen is a station on Line 9 of the Shanghai Metro. As part of the line's phase 2 easterly extension, it began operation on December 31, 2009. It is the first station in Puxi when travelling southwest-bound on Line 9 from Pudong.

References 

Railway stations in Shanghai
Line 9, Shanghai Metro
Shanghai Metro stations in Huangpu District
Railway stations in China opened in 2009